Phú Thọ is a district-level town in Phú Thọ Province, Vietnam. As of 2003, the town had a population of 63,333. The town covers an area of 64 km².

Geography 
Phú Thọ is bordered by Phù Ninh to the north, Thanh Ba to the southwest, Tam Nông to the south and Lâm Thao to the southeast.

Transport 

Phu Tho is well connected with Ha Noi by public transport.

References

Districts of Phú Thọ province
Populated places in Phú Thọ province
County-level towns in Vietnam